This is the list of cathedrals in Croatia sorted by denomination.

Roman Catholic
Cathedrals of the Roman Catholic Church in Croatia:
 Cathedral of St. Teresa of Ávila in Bjelovar
Co-cathedral of the Holy Cross in Križevci
 St. Peter’s Cathedral in Đakovo
 Co-Cathedral of Sts. Peter and Paul in Osijek
 Cathedral of the Assumption of the Blessed Virgin Mary in Dubrovnik
 Cathedral of the Blessed Virgin Mary in Gospić
 Co-cathedral of the Assumption of the Blessed Virgin Mary in Senj
 Cathedral of St. Stephen in Hvar
 Cathedral of the Assumption of the Blessed Virgin Mary in Krk
 Cathedral Basilica of the Assumption of Mary (Euphrasian Basilica) in Poreč
Co-cathedral of the Assumption of the Blessed Virgin Mary in Pula
 Cathedral of St. Teresa of Ávila in Požega
 St. Vitus Cathedral in Rijeka
 Cathedral of St James in Šibenik
 Cathedral of the Exaltation of the Holy Cross in Sisak
 Cathedral of St. Dominus in Split
 Co-Cathedral of St. Peter in Split
 Cathedral of the Assumption of the Blessed Virgin Mary in Varaždin
 Cathedral Basilica of St. Anastasia in Zadar
 Cathedral of the Assumption of the Blessed Virgin Mary, St. Stephen and Ladislaus in Zagreb
 Greek Catholic Cathedral of Holy Trinity in Križevci (Croatian Rite)
 Co-Cathedral of Sts. Cyril and Methodius in Zagreb (Croatian Rite)

Former cathedrals
 Korčula Cathedral in Korčula

Eastern Orthodox

Cathedrals of the Serbian Orthodox Church:
 Cathedral of the Transfiguration in Zagreb
 Cathedral of Saint Nicholas in Karlovac
 Cathedral of Holy Trinity in Pakrac
 Cathedral of the Assumption of the Virgin in Šibenik
 Cathedral of St. Demetrius in Dalj

See also
Lists of cathedrals by country

References

External links

Croatia
Cathedrals
Cathedrals